Godfrey Walker Talbot OBE (8 October 1908 – 2 September 2000) was an English broadcast journalist. After an early career in print journalism, his time as a BBC Radio journalist included periods as a war reporter and royal correspondent. He was the first officially accredited court correspondent at Buckingham Palace.

Life 
Talbot was born on 8 October 1908 at Walton, near Wakefield, Yorkshire, and he was educated at Leeds Grammar School. He joined the Yorkshire Post at the age of 20. Four years later, he was editor of the Manchester City News, then worked at the Daily Dispatch, before joining the BBC in 1937.

During World War II, having been sent to replace Richard Dimbleby, he reported on North African battles such as Al Alamein and Cassino, for which he was mentioned in despatches and, in 1946, made a military Officer of the Order of the British Empire (OBE).

He appeared as a castaway on the BBC Radio programme Desert Island Discs on 29 August 1960. In the same year, he was appointed a Member of the Royal Victorian Order. He published two volumes of autobiography.

He died peacefully at home on 3 September 2000. He and his wife Bess Owen had two sons; she and one of them pre-deceased him.

Bibliography 
 
  (autobiography)
  (autobiography)

References

External links 
 
 Godfrey Talbot: The Voice of the Desert and the 8th Army Oral history, at the Second World War Experience Centre

1908 births
2000 deaths
BBC radio presenters
English male journalists
English newspaper editors
Members of the Royal Victorian Order
Officers of the Order of the British Empire
People educated at Leeds Grammar School
People from the City of Wakefield
Place of death missing
War correspondents of World War II
Journalists from Yorkshire
Royal correspondents